Torrent Falls is a landmark outdoor residential property near the small community of Torrent, Kentucky, USA, which is near Natural Bridge State Park, Red River Gorge and Daniel Boone National Forest in Kentucky. At one time, a health and vacation resort for the wealthy, it has a striking waterfall, both traditional and sport rock climbing, a loop trail and cabins available for vacation rentals on this private property.

Torrent Falls is located on Kentucky Route 11 south of Natural Bridge State Park in Wolfe County.

External links 
 Torrent Falls website

Waterfalls of Kentucky
Landforms of Wolfe County, Kentucky
Tourist attractions in Wolfe County, Kentucky